Joshua Brookes (born 28 April 1983 in Sydney, New South Wales, Australia) is a professional road racer of motorcycles with experience of Superbike and Supersport racing, both domestically and internationally. For 2023, Brookes will join FHO Racing aboard a BMW M1000RR.

In 2020, he raced in the British Superbike Championship aboard a Ducati Panigale where he won his second British title, followed by a sixth finish in the 2021 championship. For 2022, Brookes remained with the same team, renamed as MCE Ducati.

Career

Early career
In 2004 he won the World Supersport round at Philip Island as a wild card, before a serious crash ruined his year. He returned to win Australia's Superbike and Supersport titles in 2005 on a Honda.

Supersport & Superbike World Championship
He then moved to World Supersport with a Caracchi Ducati for 2006, but left the team mid-season despite a 6th place at his home round. Brookes was soon racing again however, joining Bertocchi Kawasaki in the Superbike World Championship, debuting on the bike at the Italian round at Mugello. He ran 4th in a wet race in the Netherlands before falling, but generally struggled, as it was his first time living in Europe, mostly on circuits he did not know.

He did enough to be retained for 2007, with the team gaining new investors, a switch to Honda Fireblade bikes, and a new teammate in fellow Australian Karl Muggeridge. Despite 9 points finishes in the first 7 two-race rounds, the team missed round 8 after a legal challenge from Sergio Bertocchi.

Brookes joined the Stiggy Motorsport Honda team in the Supersport World Championship for the final 5 rounds. He continued with them in 2008. Brookes scored his second win (and Stiggy's first) at Donington Park, moving up to second in the championship. He also made a one-off appearance in the British Supersport Championship for HM Plant Honda, qualifying on pole and finishing third].

British Superbike Championship
For 2009, Brookes switches to British Superbikes with HM Plant Honda, alongside fellow Aussie Glen Richards, however he was forced to miss the opening round due to visa issues. Round 3 at Donington Park was also a disaster, as Brookes collided with Sylvain Guintoli on the sighting lap on the way to the grid, causing a broken leg for the Frenchman. Brookes claimed to have experienced a brake failure, if proven these allegations would have left Honda liable: for this reason they neglected to give their support. He received a one-race suspended ban as a result. In the next meeting at Thruxton he took seventh and third, with some fighting overtaking moves in race two especially. He followed this with a front row start and two third places at Snetterton.

Brookes was involved in further controversy at Mallory Park. While running fourth he lost control of the bike, resulting in a crash with the leader Simon Andrews. The Honda's engine case broke, spilling oil on the track and causing five other riders to crash. All riders involved in the accident were omitted from the result, even those who deliberately downed the bikes to avoid further carnage, due to red flag regulations. Brookes apologised in a TV interview later in the programme for his mistake. He had sustained a broken thumb from the crash. The BSB officials awarded him a 2-race ban following the incident, for "not riding in a manner compatible with general safety". He finished 3rd on his return at Croft, defending from one-off teammate Ryuichi Kiyonari on the line.

Despite the bad blood felt towards Brookes, GSE Airwaves Yamaha boss, Colin Wright told a Eurosport TV interview at Brands Hatch that he would like to sign Brookes for 2010, if he were to lose one or both 2009 riders. As it turned out, GSE Yamaha would not return in 2010.

For 2010 Brookes stayed with the HM Plant Honda team, Brookes has changed to bike #4 and is also joined by former double British Superbike Champion Ryuichi Kiyonari. He took his first win in the fourth race of the season. He also took a win at Cadwell Park and two wins at Snetterton. His season was closely documented in the film I, Superbiker.

He also made a British Superstock entry in the MotoGP support round at Silverstone, and a World Superbike appearance substituting for injured countryman Broc Parkes at Phillip Island. Brookes will also make a wildcard entry with teammate Kiyonari at Silverstone.

For 2011 Brookes switched to the Relentless TAS Suzuki team joined by Alastair Seeley who is competing in British Supersport. He a poor start to the season with a massive crash at Oulton Park which wrecked his bike. By mid-season he started to get good results.

During 2015 he raced a Milwaukee Yamaha YZF-R1, winning the British Superbike Championship at the final round of the season at Brands Hatch. In the last race of the event, Brookes hit the inside kerb of a bend and slid off, but had already amassed sufficient points to win the Championship in the first of three races at the venue, so he re-joined the track for a lap after the race to wave to spectators.

In 2017, Brookes finished second in the championship standings aboard a Yamaha. He won two races and scored four second places.

Isle of Man TT

On 28 November 2012, it was announced that Brookes would compete at the 2013 Isle of Man TT Races. As a high-profile 'newcomer' similar to Steve Plater, Brookes would compete for Tyco Suzuki in the Superbike, Superstock and Senior categories.

In the 2013 Superbike race, Brookes became the fastest-ever newcomer, with a lap of 127.726 mph (which stood until the 129 mph lap of Peter Hickman in 2014) and finished in 10th position. From his two other entries, he finished in 46th place and a DNF (did not finish).

Brookes had better results at the 2014 TT, with a 7th, 10th, 67th and DNF from his four classes entered.

Career statistics

All-time statistics

Supersport World Championship

Races by year
(key) (Races in bold indicate pole position, races in italics indicate fastest lap)

Superbike World Championship

Races by year
(key) (Races in bold indicate pole position, races in italics indicate fastest lap)

British Superbike Championship

Races by year
(key)

Notes
1. – Brookes was excluded from the rounds due to causing an accident during Race 1 at Mallory Park.
2. – 2010–2013 Brookes qualified for "The Showdown" part of the BSB season, thus before the 10th round he was awarded 500 points plus the podium credits he had gained throughout the season. Podium credits are given to anyone finishing 1st, 2nd or 3rd, with 3, 2 and 1 points awarded respectively.
3. – 2014–2019 Brookes qualified for "The Showdown" part of the BSB season, thus before the 10th round he was awarded 500 points plus the podium credits he had gained throughout the season. Podium credits are given to anyone finishing 1st, 2nd or 3rd, with 5, 3 and 1 points awarded respectively.

Superstock 1000

Races by year
(key) (Races in bold indicate pole position, races in italics indicate fastest lap)

References

External links
  Rider Profile

1983 births
Living people
Superbike World Championship riders
Supersport World Championship riders
British Superbike Championship riders
Motorcycle racers from Sydney
Isle of Man TT riders